Yomari, also called yamari,  is a delicacy of the Newar community in Nepal. It is a steamed dumpling that consists of an external covering of rice flour  with sweet fillings such as chaku and khuwa. The delicacy plays a very important role in Newa society, and is a key part of the festival of Yomari Punhi. According to some, the triangular shape of the Yamari is a symbolical representation of one half of the Shadkona, the symbol of Saraswati and wisdom.

Etymology
The name "yamari" comes from two Nepal Bhasa words, "Ya:"() meaning "to like" and "Mari"() meaning "delicacy/bread". So, yamari literally means a popular (liked) delicacy.

History
The Yomari Punhi festival is said to have started in Panchal Nagar (present-day Panauti). Myth has it that Suchandra and Krita, a married couple, first experimented with a fresh yield of rice from their field. And what took shape came to be known as yamari. The new delicacy was eventually distributed among the villagers. As the food was liked by all, the bread was named yamari, which literally means 'tasty bread'.

The myth further states that on the same day the couple offered the god of wealth, Kubera, who was passing by in a disguise, the new delicacy. Following this, Kubera disclosed his real identity and blessed the couple with wealth. He also declared that whoever will prepare yamari in the form of gods and goddesses on the full moon of December and observe four days of devotion to god, will get rid of poverty.

Festival
The festival of Yomari Punhi is celebrated on the second day of the full moon when prayers are offered during which the yomaris are stored and not eaten on that very day. On the fourth and the final day the people belonging to the Newa community consume the sweet bread as a gift from gods and this practice also marks the end of the festival.

See also

 List of Nepalese dishes

References

External links

 Yomari recipe

Dumplings
Newari cuisine
Nepalese desserts